is a Japanese surname. Notable people with the surname include:

Daichi Inui (born 1989), Japanese association football player (J1 League)
Emi Inui (born 1983), Japanese Olympic softball player
Kurumi Inui (born 1963), Japanese novelist and mystery writer
Masahiro Inui (born 1988), Japanese baseball player
Sekihiko Inui, Japanese manga artist
Takashi Inui (born 1988), Japanese association football player in Europe
Takaya Inui (born 1990), Japanese association football player (J2 League)
Tatsuro Inui (born 1990), Japanese association football player in Southeast Asia
Yukiko Inui (born 1990), Japanese synchronized swimmer

Fictional characters
Sadaharu Inui, character in The Prince of Tennis
Takumi Inui, main character in Kamen Rider 555
Inui Banjin, villain in the Rurouni Kenshins Jinchu Arc (Man's Justice Arc)

Japanese-language surnames